Moment exotique, also known as Danse excentrique, is a short concert piece for solo piano by the Russian pianist Vladimir Horowitz.

Background
The piece is thought to have been composed in either 1920 or 1921, before Horowitz left Russia. He originally composed the piece for his brother's 18th birthday party. Horowitz first recorded the piece on a piano roll for Welte-Mignon in 1926 and later went on to record it for RCA Records in 1930, this time as an audio recording.

Analysis
The piece is written in a cakewalk style.  It is a colorful and cheery piece lasting around two and a half minutes.

References

External links
1930 recording of Moment exotique (YouTube)

Vladimir Horowitz
Compositions for solo piano
1921 compositions